Los Vilos (From mapuche: Filu, ‘snake’)? is both a Chilean coastal commune and a coastal city with over 9,000 inhabitants (18,275 in comuna), located in the Province of Choapa, part of the IV Region of Coquimbo. The city has a harbour called  Puerto Punta Chungo, that ships the material of Los Pelambres mine. Fishing is one of its main activities. The city also has a significant amount of tourism, mainly due to its two beaches: La Principal and Las Conchas.

The city was founded in 1830, and was declared a minor harbor in 1855.

History 
Los Vilos has existed as a small informal settlement since 1835, when the government realised that a port was needed in that region to expand the reach of commerce in the country. On January 3, 1855, it was declared a minor port by then president, Manuel Montt and by his Minister of Finance, José María Berganza, through a supreme decree of the Finance Ministry.

On April of that same year a permission was granted by the government to start the construction of a dock, warehouses and commerce related buildings. On December 1857, it was determined that a town needed to be built so 25 blocks, that used to belong to the Conchali Hacienda, were designed and sold by Hernán Jequier as a public utility. The town was located around the small pre-existing settlement.

The port responded to the need to regulate the commerce in the area, so a customs office, that depended on the Valparaiso custom, was created. The economy of Los Vilos initially depended largely on commerce.

Demographics
Of these, 12,859 (73.7%) lived in urban areas and 4,594 (26.3%) in rural areas. The population grew by 10.4% (1,648 persons) between the 1992 and 2002 censuses.

Administration
As a commune, Los Vilos is a third-level administrative division of Chile administered by a municipal council, headed by an alcalde who is directly elected every four years.

The current alcalde is Manuel Marcarián Julio (an independent that is part of the New Majority pact, and the current council has the following members
 Christian Gross Hidalgo (PS)
 Iris Hidalgo (UDI
 Juan Hisi Espinoza (PRI)
 Berta Martínez (RN)
 Héctor Molina Fuenzalida (PPD)
 Julio Werner (DC)
Within the electoral divisions of Chile, Los Vilos is represented in the Chamber of Deputies by Adriana Muñoz (PDC) and Luis Lemus (Ind.) as part of the 9th electoral district, (together with Combarbalá, Punitaqui, Monte Patria, Illapel, Salamanca and Canela). The commune is represented in the Senate by Adriana Muñoz (PPD) and Jorge Pizarro Soto (PDC) as part of the 4th senatorial constituency (Coquimbo Region).

Tourism 
The comuna has a considerable amount of tourism, in both the Los Vilos City, and in the small coastal town of Pichidangui.

References

External links
  Municipality of Los Vilos

Communes of Chile
Port cities in Chile
Populated places in Choapa Province
1830 establishments in Chile
Coasts of Coquimbo Region